Arsinoe , pronounced Arsinoi in modern Greek, may refer to:

People
 Arsinoe of Macedon, mother of Ptolemy I Soter
 Apama II or Arsinoe (c. 292 BC–after 249 BC), wife of Magas of Cyrene and mother of Berenice II
 Arsinoe, probable mother of Lysimachus or his first wife Nicaea of Macedon
 Arsinoe I (305 BC–247 BC) of Egypt
 Arsinoe II (316 BC–270 BC) of Egypt
 Arsinoe III of Egypt (c. 246 BC–204 BC)
 Arsinoe IV of Egypt (died 41 BC), half-sister of Cleopatra VII
 Arsinoe (mythology), name of multiple mythological figures

Places
 Arsinoe (Cilicia)
 Arsinoe (Crete)
 Arsinoe (Northwest Cyprus)
 Arsinoe (Southwest Cyprus)
 Arsinoe (Gulf of Suez), a port of Egypt
 Arsinoe (Eritrea)
 Conope (Greece) or Arsinoe
 Ephesus, also called Arsinoe
 Faiyum (Egypt), also called Arsinoe or Crocodilopolis, seat of the Roman Catholic titular bishopric Arsinoë in Arcadia
 Famagusta (Cyprus) or Arsinoe
 Coressia (Greece), called Arsinoe in the Hellenistic period
 Methana (Greece), called Arsinoe in the Ptolemaic period
 Olbia (Egypt) or Arsinoe
 Patara (Lycia) or Arsinoe
 Taucheira (Libya) or Arsinoe
 Arsinoes Chaos, located in the Margaritifer Sinus quadrangle on Mars

Literature
 Arsinoe, a character in Le Misanthrope by Molière
 Arsinoe, a character in The Etruscan by Mika Waltari
 Arsinoe, a character in Three Dark Crowns by Kendare Blake
 Arsinoe, Queen of Cyprus, a 1705 English opera

Other uses
 Arsinoe (beetle), a genus of beetles in the family Carabidae
 404 Arsinoë, an asteroid

See also
 Arsinoi, a community in Messenia